The Women's 500 m time trial competition at the 2019 UCI Track Cycling World Championships was held on 2 March 2019.

Results

Qualifying
The qualifying was started at 12:00. The top 8 riders qualified for the final.

Final
The final was started at 17:00.

References

Women's 500 m time trial
2019